Beenleigh is a town and suburb in the City of Logan, Queensland, Australia.

A government survey for the new town was conducted in 1866. The town is the terminus for the Beenleigh railway line, which first opened in 1885 and a stop on the South Coast railway line, which reached Southport in 1889.  Beenleigh was the administrative centre of the former Shire of Albert.  It is known for the heritage-listed tourist attraction called the Beenleigh Artisan Distillery. In recent years it has seen many high rise developments.

Geography
Beenleigh and adjoining suburbs are located near the confluence of the Logan and Albert Rivers.  The urban centre lies southwest of the Pacific Motorway after it crosses the Logan River and is crossed by the Gold Coast railway line.  Logan River Parklands contain a boat ramp, barbeques, and a picnic area. Whilst it was once a stand-alone town built on sugar and home to Australia's oldest rum distillery built in 1864, increasing development in South East Queensland since the 1980s has seen it enveloped by Brisbane and the Gold Coast.

There are two railway stations in the suburb (from north to south):

 Holmview railway station
 Beenleigh railway station

History

Beenleigh is situated in the Bundjalung traditional Indigenous Australian country. The Yugambeh people are custodians within the traditional Aboriginal Bundjalung country, antedating European settlement by tens of thousands of years. Their Yugambeh language and heritage survive and is a testament to the Yugambeh Museum located in the town. Yugembah (also known as Yugumbir, Jugambel, Jugambeir, Jugumbir, Jukam, Jukamba) is one of the Australian Aboriginal languages in areas that include the Beenleigh, Beaudesert, Gold Coast, Logan, Scenic Rim, Albert River, Coolangatta, Coomera, Logan River, Pimpama, Tamborine and Tweed River Valley, within the local government boundaries of the City of Gold Coast, City of Logan, Scenic Rim Regional Council and the Tweed River Valley.

Beenleigh was first colonised in the 1860s, with the first permanent European settlement occurring by John Davy and Frank Gooding, who named their sugarcane plantation Beenleigh in memory of their family estate in Devonshire, England.

William Fryar surveyed the Town of Beenleigh in July 1866.

The first sugarcane mill was built in 1867, and by 1885, another 29 were operational.

Beenleigh Post Office opened on 1 August 1867.Beenleigh State School was opened on 6 February 1871. From 1954 to 1962 it also had a secondary department. From 4 February 1974 to 1980 the school had an Opportunity Class to provide special education.

St George's Anglican Church was officially opened on Thursday 16 September 1875. A second St George's was built next door at 10 Tansey Street in 1964. In 1981 the first church building was moved to its present site at the Beenleigh Historical Village in Main Street and has been repaired.

On 3 December 1885, 85 resubdivided allotments of "Beenleigh Township Estate" were advertised to be auctioned by J.R. Dickson and Co. on 26 December 1885. A map advertising the auction states that the Estate was close to the Beenleigh Railway Station and was the property of the late Peter Benz.

In October 1886, a well-known property on the Albert River owned by W. K. Witty called "Yellowwood Estate" was advertised for subdivision into suitable sized farms and then auctioned by Simon Fraser & Son. A map advertising the auction states that 40 choice farms were available and the auction was to be held on Saturday 27 November at the Palm's Hotel, Beenleigh.

Beenleigh Wesleyan Methodist Church opened on Sunday 28 November 1886.

Commercial dairying in the area began in 1889.

In June 1922, 12 portions of farm land located on the Logan River were advertised to be auctioned by Cameron Bros Auctioneers. A map advertising the auction states that the land was within easy reach of Cleveland Railway Station and Beenleigh, and that there was a steamer service weekly. The land was advertised as suitable for growing arrowroot and sugarcane and magnificent for dairying.

The Beenleigh Memorial Park was dedicated on 21 August 1925.

The abattoir was established in 1952 for beef production, and is still one of the largest industries in Beenleigh. Beenleigh State High School opened on 29 January 1963. Beenleigh Special School opened on 1 January 1981.

St Joseph's Tobruk Memorial School opened on 25 October 1953.

Beenleigh State High School opened on 29 Jan 1963, replacing the secondary department at Beenleigh State School.

Beenleigh Special School opened in January 1981, replacing the opportunity class at Beenleigh State School.

Trinity College opened on 25 January 1982.

Beenleigh was the centre of the Beenleigh Shire until 1949, then Shire of Albert, which also included the suburbs of Eagleby, Alberton, Mt Warren Park, Windaroo, Edens Landing, Holmview, Pimpama, and Jacobs Well. In 1995, Albert Shire was dissolved and Beenleigh and the surrounding suburbs were then amalgamated into City of Gold Coast. In 2008, these suburbs were transferred from Gold Coast City to City of Logan (despite protests from locals, who voted against being part of Logan).

Beenleigh Mitre 10 MEGA opened in 2004; it was the company's first Australian MEGA store, and it employed over 200 people on opening.

Demographics
The median age of the Beenleigh population was 34 years, compared to the national median age of 37; 66.9% of people living in Beenleigh were born in Australia. The other top responses for country of birth were New Zealand 8.1%, England 3.4%, the Philippines 1.1%, Brazil 0.6%, and Germany 0.5%. About 81.5% of people spoke only English at home; the next-most common languages were 0.7% Portuguese, 0.6% Tagalog, 0.6% Vietnamese, 0.4% Spanish, and 0.3% German.

Heritage listings
Beenleigh has a number of heritage-listed sites, including:
 Distillery Road: Beenleigh Rum Distillery
 Main Street: St George's Anglican Church

Education 
Beenleigh State School is a government primary (Prep-6) school for boys and girls at 22 James Street. In 2018, the school had an enrolment of 395 students with 32 teachers (29 full-time equivalent) and 18 non-teaching staff (12 full-time equivalent). It includes a special education program.

Despite its name, Beenleigh Special School is located in neighbouring Mount Warren Park.

St Joseph's Tobruk Memorial School is a Catholic primary (Prep-6) school for boys and girls at 53 Kokoda Street. In 2018, the school had an enrolment of 351 students with 27 teachers (22 full-time equivalent) and 16 non-teaching staff (11 full-time equivalent).

Beenleigh State High School is a government secondary (7-12) school for boys and girls at Alamein Street. In 2018, the school had an enrolment of 1621 students with 133 teachers (127 full-time equivalent) and 78 non-teaching staff (58 full-time equivalent). It includes a special education program.

Trinity College is a Catholic secondary (7-12) school for boys and girls at Scott Street. In 2018, the school had an enrolment of 815 students with 73 teachers (71 full-time equivalent) and 29 non-teaching staff (26 full-time equivalent).

Facilities 
Beenleigh Police Station is at 3 Kent Street.

Beenleigh SES Facility is at 36 Martens Street.

Amenities 

Still predominately a self-sufficient town with expanding retail and commercial areas close by, Beenleigh is home to three shopping centres with Coles Supermarkets, Woolworths, Big W, Aldi, and a Mitre 10 MEGA.

At the heart of Beenleigh stands the Southern District Court complex, first established in 1871. For many years, the court was constituted solely of three magistrates; this changed with the allocation of a permanent sitting District Court of Queensland Judge in 1998. The first presiding district court judge in Beenleigh was Judge O'Brien. Recently, the Southern District Court complex has played an integral role in the development of the progressive Drug Court.

The town has a community centre and two theatres (Crete Street Theatre and Phoenix Ensemble).

The Logan City Council operate a public library at Crete Street.

The Beenleigh branch of the Queensland Country Women's Association meets at the Beenleigh Neighbourhood Centre at 10 James Street.

St George's Anglican Church is at 10 Tansey Street.

Beenleigh Region Uniting Church is at 32-50 Mount Warren Boulevard in neighbouring Mount Warren Park.

Day care facilities are available at the Lutheran Beenleigh Family Day Care Scheme.

There are a number of parks in the area, including:

 Bill Norris Oval
 Dauth Park

 Emerald Park

 Hammel Park

 Hugh Muntz Park

 Ibis Park

 Logan River Parklands

 Tallangandra Road Park

 Willow Park

Transport 
Beenleigh is situated on the Pacific Motorway. Queensland Rail City network provides frequent services to Brisbane and the Gold Coast via the Beenleigh railway line at the centrally located Beenleigh railway station.

Attractions 
The Beenleigh Historical Village preserves 20 historic buildings and houses a number of collections of historic material from the region.

The town is also home to the Beenleigh Artisan Distillers, Australia's oldest rum distillery, Yugambeh Language and Research Centre, Poppy's Chocolates and Windaroo Organic Cottage just 5 minutes out of town.

Events
Social events of note are the annual Rum, Rump, and Rhumba Festival, Eats and Beats Food Trucks, and the Beenleigh Show.

Sport and recreation
Sporting facilities that are represented in Beenleigh cover baseball, soccer, BMX, football, tennis, swimming, netball, and roller derby.  Beenleigh enjoys access to the Logan River via a boat ramp located near the northern bridge on the Pacific Motorway.

References

External links

 
 
 
 
  – 1905 description of Beenleigh

 
Suburbs of Logan City
Towns in Queensland
Localities in Queensland
Populated places established in 1866
1866 establishments in Australia